The 2004 Dodge/Save Mart 350 was the 16th stock car race of the 2004 NASCAR Nextel Cup Series season and the 16th iteration of the event. The race was held on Sunday, June 27, 2004, in Sonoma, California, at the club layout in Infineon Raceway, a  permanent road course layout. The race took the scheduled 110 laps to complete. At race's end, Jeff Gordon of Hendrick Motorsports would dominate the race to win his 67th career NASCAR Nextel Cup Series win and his third of the season. To fill out the podium, Jamie McMurray and Scott Pruett of Chip Ganassi Racing would finish second and third, respectively.

Background 

Infineon Raceway is one of two road courses to hold NASCAR races, the other being Watkins Glen International. The Chute was only used for NASCAR events such as this race, and was criticized by many drivers, who preferred the full layout.

Entry list 

*Withdrew.

Practice

First practice 
The first practice would occur on Friday, June 25, at 11:20 AM PST, and would last for two hours.

Second practice 
The second practice would occur on Saturday, June 26, at 9:30 AM PST and would last for 45 minutes.

Third and final practice 
The third and final practice session, sometimes referred to as Happy Hour, would occur on Saturday, June 26, at 11:10 AM PST and would last for 45 minutes.

Qualifying 
Qualifying was held on Friday, June 25, at 3:10 PM PST. Drivers would each have one lap to set a lap time. Positions 1-38 would be decided on time, while positions 39-43 would be based on provisionals. Four spots are awarded by the use of provisionals based on owner's points. The fifth is awarded to a past champion who has not otherwise qualified for the race. If no past champ needs the provisional, the next team in the owner points will be awarded a provisional.

Multiple drivers would suffer incidents that would considerably slow down their lap times or make them not set a lap. Michael Waltrip would report smoke and blow an engine coming into Turn 7 on his lap. Scott Riggs would spin, but still complete his lap. Ricky Craven would spin in Turn 10

Full qualifying results

Race results

References 

2004 NASCAR Nextel Cup Series
NASCAR races at Sonoma Raceway
June 2004 sports events in the United States
2004 in sports in California